Below is a listing of all rugby union players that have represented the South Africa Under-18 (South Africa Schools) side since 1974.

See also
 South Africa national under-18 rugby union team

References

School of Rugby

Under